William Van Amberg Sullivan (December 18, 1857March 21, 1918) was a United States representative and Senator from Mississippi.

Biography
Born near Winona, Mississippi, he attended the common schools in Panola County and the University of Mississippi at Oxford, where he was a member of St. Anthony Hall.

He graduated from Vanderbilt University, in Nashville, Tennessee, in 1875, was admitted to the bar that year, and commenced practice in Austin. He moved to Oxford in 1877, was a member of the board of city aldermen, and was elected as a Democrat to the Fifty-fifth Congress and served from March 4, 1897, to May 31, 1898, when he resigned, having been appointed Senator.

He was appointed and subsequently elected to the U.S. Senate to fill the vacancy caused by the death of Edward C. Walthall and served from May 31, 1898, to March 3, 1901; he was not a candidate for reelection.

On September 8, 1908, Sullivan led a lynch mob which murdered a black man named Nelse Patton, who had been accused of killing a white woman. William Sullivan was quoted a day later as saying, "I led the mob which lynched Nelse Patton, and I'm proud of it. I directed every movement of the mob and I did everything I could to see that he was lynched."

Sullivan retired from active business and resided in Washington, D.C. In 1918, he died in Oxford. Interment was in St. Peter's Cemetery.

References

External links

 

1857 births
1918 deaths
People from Oxford, Mississippi
People from Winona, Mississippi
Vanderbilt University alumni
Mississippi lawyers
Mississippi city council members
Democratic Party United States senators from Mississippi
Democratic Party members of the United States House of Representatives from Mississippi
19th-century American politicians
19th-century American lawyers
19th-century American businesspeople
American murderers
American white supremacists